Mr Benn is a character created by David McKee who originally appeared in several children's books. The first, Mr Benn Red Knight, was published in 1967, followed by three more; these became the basis for an animated television series of the same name originally transmitted by the BBC in 1971 and 1972.

In both the books and the television series, Mr Benn's adventures take on a similar pattern.  Mr Benn, a man wearing a black suit and bowler hat, leaves his house at 52 Festive Road, London, and visits a fancy-dress costume shop where he is invited by the moustachioed, fez-wearing shopkeeper to try on a particular outfit. He leaves the shop through a magic door at the back of the changing room and enters a world appropriate to his costume, where he has an adventure (which usually contains a moral) before the shopkeeper reappears to lead him back to the changing room, and the story comes to an end.  Mr Benn returns to his normal life, but is left with a small souvenir of his magical adventure. Additionally, scenes before and after his adventure usually have some connection to it, such as the games the children are playing in the street as he passes.

Books

David McKee got the inspiration for Mr Benn from Festing Road in Putney where he used to live. McKee had the house "next door" at 54 Festing Road, where residents installed an engraved paving slab in his honour on 26 November 2009. ("I think it was because in the first book I drew myself looking out of the window, and I thought it would be quite nice to have him next door", said McKee.)

McKee said he had always thought of Mr Benn as having the first name William.

Mr Benn's adventures are available to buy in book-form: four were published originally, and further books in the 1990s were based on the television series.  The original four books were: Mr Benn – Red Knight, Big Game Benn, 123456789 Benn, and Big Top Benn. There were six original books planned, but the fifth and sixth were never published. The fifth was called Mr Benn Rides Again, the story of which was used to make the television episode The Cowboy. The sixth, never completed, was Superbenn, in which the superhero Mr Benn sets out on an environmental adventure.

There is one book for which no corresponding television episode has been made. 123456789 Benn was published in 1970 and tells the story of Mr Benn as a convict (hence the number) inspiring his jail-mates to brighten up their cells. This was after the BBC – who screened the television series – felt that the story was too mature for a children's series.

A new story was published in 2001, the first Mr Benn story that McKee had written in thirty years, and is called Mr Benn – Gladiator.  McKee indicated that he might write more Mr Benn stories, but none were published before his death.

In 2001 Mr Benn's Little Book of Life was published by Tess Read, which explores the lessons of Mr Benn's adventures.

The only character who appears several times, apart from Mr Benn and the shopkeeper, is Smasher Lagru. Smasher first appears as an inmate in 123456789 Benn, and then after his release in Big-Top Benn and the new Mr Benn – Gladiator.

A Mr Benn Annual  was published by Polystyle Publications Ltd in 1972. It was written by Jan Falconer and illustrated by David McKee. This contained a number of illustrated text stories, three strip-cartoon style adventures and a few puzzle pages. Mr Benn visits: China for a kite festival, a fairytale Arabia, Venice and Holland. He also becomes a barrow boy in a pearly suit and meets Mr Grubbly and his animal friends in the African jungle.

Tate Publishing republished all of the original books in 2010.

Television 

McKee wrote and animated (with Ian Lawless) thirteen Mr Benn episodes for the BBC between 1971 and 1972. These episodes were repeated twice a year for 21 years with further repeats airing in 1993, 1994, 1996, 1997, 1998 and 2000. The episodes were narrated by Ray Brooks. The music is credited as composed by Don Warren, which was a pseudonym for Duncan Lamont.

Although Smasher Lagru features in The Gladiator, he does not appear in The Clown as the book in which he made his debut, 123456789Benn, was not adapted for television – thus it would have been strange that he and Mr Benn already knew each other. The Hunter was also slightly altered; the book Big Game Benn features several hunters, but only one appears in the television episode.

McKee did not benefit financially to the extent he might have: "I signed a contract where I only got a one-off payment and no repeat fees, but I've done quite well from a number of other things and I'm still exhibiting paintings." According to Mr Benn's Little Book of Life, very little of McKee's original artwork created for the television episodes exists today, as most of it was thrown into a rubbish skip in the 1970s.

After over thirty years, a brand new Mr Benn episode was screened for the first time on 1 January 2005, on the United Kingdom channel Noggin. The episode was based on McKee's 2001 book Mr Benn - Gladiator.

The series was voted the sixth most popular children's television programme in the 2001 Channel 4 poll 100 Greatest Kids' TV shows. It was also rated number 13 in the 50 Greatest Kids TV Shows which aired on Channel 5 on 8 November 2013.

Episode listing

The first six episodes of Mr Benn were broadcast Thursday afternoons on BBC1 at 1:30pm from 25 February to 1 April 1971. When the final seven episodes aired Friday afternoons on BBC1 at 1:30pm from 21 January to 31 March 1972 the first six were shown again but in a different order.

Four of the episodes were billed with alternate titles in Radio Times.

The one-off special episode based on the final Mr Benn book called "Gladiator" was broadcast on The Noggin Channel (a Nick Jr. channel of classic shows as part of the Nickelodeon franchise) in 2005.

Other appearances

Film
In 1999, it was reported that a feature film was in development and that director Jevon O'Neill's production company, Erinfilm, had purchased the film rights to Mr Benn from David McKee. The film was to star John Hannah as Mr Benn and Ben Kingsley as the Shopkeeper. However, the film was cancelled in 2001 and, as of 2017, the project remains dormant. In an interview with the BBC in May 2014, McKee stated that, on a film version: "I'd like to see that [the film] happen, because Mr Benn's a big boy and he can live his own life. I think he's right for being developed on the big screen".

Theatrical adaptation
Mr Benn was adapted for the stage by Tall Stories Theatre Company. It was first performed at the 2011 Edinburgh Fringe and toured until 2013.

DVD release
 Title: Mr Benn: The Complete Series
Label: Contender Home Entertainment
Release Date: 2005
Catalogue N°: CTD10390
Availability: In Print

Advertising

In 1993, a popular advert for 'R Whites Lemonade', 'Secret Lemonade Drinker', was subverted by having 'The Shop Keeper' appear, who takes the 'Secret Lemonade Drinker' back to the changing room, where he is revealed to be Mr Benn on an adventure. As Mr Benn returns to Festive Avenue, all the children in the avenue are drinking R Whites Lemonade. The advert was narrated by Ray Brooks.

In 2013 Mr Benn appeared in an advert for 'Mr Porter.com', an on line clothing retailer. The advert was called Mr Benn at Christmas'

In January 2018, The Insurance Emporium launched its first national TV ad featuring Mr Benn. The Financial Times observed that the ad followed a current trend in the UK of using nostalgic cartoon characters in adverts such as Lloyds Bank subsidiary, Halifax. The first advert featured Mr Benn and a new supporting character, Eddie the dog. It was the first time new content of Mr Benn had aired on British televisions since 2005. The three supporting characters were The Shopkeeper, Eddie the dog and Gus the gorilla.

Clothing accessories

In 2017, Turnbull & Asser launched 3 limited edition pocket squares featuring Mr Benn in a James Bond style, corresponding with an exhibition of original Mr Benn artworks at the Illustration Cupboard which at that time was next door in St James. Originally four different designs, the 2017 Westminster Attack caused the decision to not produce the final image of Mr Benn facing his adversaries outside the Houses of Parliament and next to the bridge in question. The original picture can be seen on the Illustration Cupboard blog.

References

Bibliography
Simon Sheridan's book The A to Z of Classic Children's Television (Reynolds & Hearn books, 2004, reprinted 2007)  contains a chapter on Mr Benn and an interview with McKee.

External links
 Mr Benn on Toonhound
 
 Clive Banks' Mr Benn tribute site
 Website of the theatrical adaptation

See also
 The Secret Life of Walter Mitty

1970s British animated television series
1970s British children's television series
1971 British television series debuts
2005 British television series endings
British children's animated fantasy television series
English-language television shows
BBC children's television shows
Animated human characters
Children's television characters
Characters in British novels of the 20th century
Literary characters introduced in 1971
Putney
British television shows based on children's books